Pelmanism was a system of brain training which was popular in the United Kingdom during the first half of the twentieth century.

History
Originally devised as a memory system in the 1890s by William Joseph Ennever, the system was taught via correspondence from the Pelman Institute in London (named after Christopher Louis Pelman). It was advertised as a system of scientific mental training which strengthened and developed one's mind just as physical training strengthened your body.  It was developed to expand "Mental Powers in every direction" and "remove those tendencies to indolence and inefficiency".

The system promised to cure a range of problems such as "grasshopper mind", forgetfulness, depression, phobia, procrastination and "Lack of System". One of the techniques taught as late as the 1950s in Britain was the Method of loci, recorded since ancient Roman rhetoric, to remember 20 or 100 items in order, keyed to a particular house or geographic route familiar to the student.

Pelmanism was practised and promoted by former British prime minister H.H. Asquith, Sir Robert Baden-Powell (founder of the Boy Scout movement), novelist Sir Rider Haggard, playwright Jerome K. Jerome and composer Dame Ethel Smyth as well as thousands of other Britons.

In the context of modern psychology, Pelmanism may have only limited academic interest. It remains of interest as a self-help tool, but is seen by some as quirky and eccentric.

See also

 Robert Frederick Foster
 Monkey mind

References

Further reading

 Ohayon, Annock (2006). Psychologie et psychanalyse en France: L'impossible rencontre (1919–1969), Éditeur : La Découverte; Nouv. éd. 2006, Coll. : La Découverte/Poche,

External links
 The Pelman Institute: History  – official
 Example of use on a learn English website
 Detailed history of Pelman, Ennever and Pelmanism 

Cognitive training